Élisabeth Brière (born 1968)  is a Canadian Liberal politician who was elected as a Member of Parliament in the House of Commons of Canada to represent the federal riding Sherbrooke during the 2019 Canadian federal election.

Electoral record

References

External links

1968 births
Living people
Women members of the House of Commons of Canada
Liberal Party of Canada MPs
Members of the House of Commons of Canada from Quebec
Politicians from Quebec City
Politicians from Sherbrooke